Hugh Brown was a Scottish amateur footballer who made one appearance as a right back in the Scottish League for Queen's Park.

Personal life 
During the First World War, Brown served in the Lovat Scouts prior to being commissioned into the Royal Scots Fusiliers. While serving as a second lieutenant, he was admitted to hospital in France after suffering gunshot wounds on the Western Front in May 1917.

Career statistics

References 

Year of birth missing
Scottish footballers
Scottish Football League players
British Army personnel of World War I
Lovat Scouts soldiers
Place of birth missing
Association football fullbacks
Queen's Park F.C. players
Date of death missing
Royal Scots Fusiliers officers